Number One with a Bullet may refer to:

 Number One with a Bullet (film), a 1987 American police detective film directed by Jack Smight
 Number One with a Bullet, a 2008 music documentary by Jim Dziura
 #1 with a Bullet, a 1991 music album by American country and comedy singer Ray Stevens

See also
 "Number One (With A Bullet)", a song by Lindsay Pagano